The 2019–20 Drexel Dragons women's basketball team represented Drexel University during the 2019–20 NCAA Division I women's basketball season. The Dragons, led by seventeenth-year head coach Denise Dillon, played their home games at the Daskalakis Athletic Center in Philadelphia, Pennsylvania as members of the Colonial Athletic Association. They finished the season 23–7, 16–2 in CAA play to finish in first place. Before they could play in the CAA tournament however, the tournament was cancelled due to the COVID-19 pandemic.

Previous season

Offseason

Departures

2019 recruiting class

Roster

Schedule and results

|-
!colspan=12 style=| Exhibition
|-

|-
!colspan=12 style=| Non-conference regular season
|-

|-
!colspan=12 style=| CAA regular season
|-

|-
!colspan=12 style=| CAA Tournament
|-

Rankings

^ Coaches did not release a Week 2 poll

See also
 2019–20 Drexel Dragons men's basketball team

References

Drexel Dragons women's basketball seasons
Drexel
Drexel
Drexel